The École, formerly 'École Internationale de New York, is an independent, French-American bilingual school serving an international community of Maternelle-to-Middle School students in New York City’s Flatiron District.

The École has been designed to cultivate an internationally minded community of students.
From Maternelle to Middle School, they artfully blend the best of the French and American educational systems, gifting students with deep bi-literacy, whole-child skills and knowledge, and an optimistic, multi-cultural perspective. So they grow more flexible and fluid, interested and interesting, persistent and positive. And always ready to shape and share their life's successes—whatever the moment and wherever they go.

Its main building is at 111 East 22nd Street between Park and Lexington Avenues, where three floors accommodate the 2nd to 5th grades and the Middle School. While the Maternelle - the preschool - and the 1st graders are at 206 Fifth Avenue between West 25th and 26th Streets.

As of 2018, The École counts 220 students. Each class has around 12 to 20 students, and each grade level has one or two classes.

The École just signed a new lease to expand its main building, doubling the usable surface. Constructions are planned to start first quarter 2019.

While it is developing, The École wants to maintain its small and strong community, never exceeding more than 20 students per class and 2 classes per grade.

History
The school opened in September 2009, making it the third French international school in Manhattan. Yves Rivaud founded École Internationale. Rivaud decided to create the school because Manhattan needed a real French American bilingual school, and he believed he would easily fill the school's enrollment upon opening.

Name and Symbol 
In September 2018, the school officially changed its name from the original Ecole Internationale de New York to the shorter, simpler, and more straightforward name it is known by now: The École. The combination of English and French in The École is a nod to the French-American bilingual focus, while also reflecting the fluidity with which students move from one of these languages to the other.

The “Conversation Mark” logo was formally adopted in 2018, at the same time as The École name. Made up of five dialog boxes, intentionally arranged to represent close, community connection and a dynamic, bilingual conversation, they also take the shape of a more classic, monogrammed “E”. To reflect the diverse perspectives and experiences of the faculty, staff, parents, and students, as well as the shared, joyous spirit, The École adopted an unusual approach to color, in which its logo can appear in six different shades—red, orange, yellow, green, teal, and blue.

Tuition
As of September 2018 the annual tuition was $33,900.

References

External links
 

French-American culture in New York City
French international schools in the United States
International schools in New York City
2009 establishments in New York City
Educational institutions established in 2009